Two steamships have borne the name Abessinia, after the German name for the Ethiopian Empire:

  was a 5,633-ton passenger/cargo ship launched on 16 June 1900, by Palmers', Jarrow, England. Lost on 3 September 1921 on her way to be delivered as war reparations.
  was a 1,565-ton cargo ship completed in October 1920, by Bremer Vulkan in Vegesack, Germany. Renamed twice, torpedoed and sunk as the Italian Sebastiano Bianchi by a submarine off Cape Spartivento, Italy, on 13 December 1940.

References

Ship names